Williston is a city in Fayette County, Tennessee, United States. The population was 395 at the 2010 census.

Geography
Williston is located south of the center of Fayette County at  (35.158955, -89.373328).

The city is located along Tennessee State Routes 76 and 193. TN 76 leads north  to Somerville, the county seat, and south  to Moscow.

Demographics

As of the census of 2000, there were 341 people, 122 households, and 91 families residing in the city. The racial makeup of the city was 64.81% White, 33.43% African American, 0.59% Asian, 0.59% from other races, and 0.59% from two or more races. Hispanic or Latino of any race were 0.29% of the population.

There were 122 households, out of which 38.5% had children under the age of 18 living with them, 54.9% were married couples living together, 18.0% had a female householder with no husband present, and 24.6% were non-families. 20.5% of all households were made up of individuals, and 8.2% had someone living alone who was 65 years of age or older. The average household size was 2.80 and the average family size was 3.28.

In the city, the population was spread out, with 30.5% under the age of 18, 8.2% from 18 to 24, 29.0% from 25 to 44, 21.1% from 45 to 64, and 11.1% who were 65 years of age or older. The median age was 36 years. For every 100 females, there were 78.5 males. For every 100 females age 18 and over, there were 74.3 males.

The median income for a household in the city was $40,625, and the median income for a family was $43,750. Males had a median income of $30,729 versus $26,719 for females. The per capita income for the city was $14,514. About 8.6% of families and 9.7% of the population were below the poverty line, including 7.1% of those under age 18 and 16.7% of those age 65 or over.

References

Gallery

Cities in Tennessee
Cities in Fayette County, Tennessee
Memphis metropolitan area